Alucheh Qeshlaq (also Romanized as Ālūcheh Qeshlāq; also known as Alcheh Gheshlagh, Ālcheh Qeshlāq, Kyshlag, Qeshlāq, Qeshlāq Ālūcheh, and Qishlāq) is a village in Bakrabad Rural District, in the Central District of Varzaqan County, East Azerbaijan Province, Iran. At the 2006 census, its population was 310, in 67 families.

References 

Towns and villages in Varzaqan County